Technical Difficulties is the third studio album by Hate Dept., released in June 1999 by Restless Records.

Reception

Steve Huey of allmusic called Technical Difficulties arguably "their most accessible release to date" and the band "may sound like an industrial band -- clanking drum machines, synthesizers, and loud, crusty guitars -- but Hate Dept. are alt-rockers at heart, emphasizing traditional song structure and punk lyrical attitude over sonic experimentation and abrasiveness." CMJ said "slamming rock intensity into the looming keyboard progressions of Front 242, while adding jazzy horns and Nine Inch Nails-worthy power ballads, Technical Difficulties is easily the most diverse and robotic weapon in Hate Dept.'s arsenal." The magazine listed Technical Difficulties as one of the magazine's top choices for the month of June.

Track listing

Accolades

Personnel
Adapted from the Technical Difficulties liner notes.

Hate Dept.
 Marc Greco – guitar, backing vocals
 Charles Hunt – drums, backing vocals, additional programming (2)
 Steven Seibold – lead vocals, programming, production, mixing
 Jeff Smith – synthesizer, backing vocals

Additional performers
 Joe Chiccarelli – additional production (1, 4)
 Tracey Hooker – trumpet (3)
 Royden Vigilance – additional vocals (3)

Production and design
 Mon Agranat – mixing
 The Gerrixx – cover art, photography
 Bill Kennedy – mixing, additional production (7, 8)
 Dustin Moore – photography
 Jenessa Nye – photography
 Eddy Schreyer – mastering
 Jon St. James – mixing, additional production (3)

Release history

References

External links 
 
 Omnipresent at Discogs (list of releases)

1999 albums
Hate Dept. albums
Restless Records albums